The 24-cm-Kanone 3 (24 cm K 3) was a German heavy siege gun used in the Second World War by the first battalion of Artillerie-Regiment 84. Four were in service when Germany invaded Poland, assigned to the first two batteries of I./AR 84, and in the Battle of France. By Operation Barbarossa all three batteries were equipped with two guns apiece. This situation did not change for the next two years.

Design and history
The gun for the K 3 was of standard construction while the carriage was considerably more innovative. Rheinmetall placed a lot of emphasis on ease of assembly. It did not require a crane because it used electric winches, mounted on the carriage, to pull various parts through a system of inclined ramps, guide rails and runways. It also used the Rheinmetall's dual-recoil system, first seen on the 21 cm Mörser 18. The barrel recoiled normally in its cradle, but, in addition, the whole top carriage, which carried the barrel and its cradle, recoiled across the main part of the carriage. This system damped out the recoil forces and made for a very steady firing platform.

The K 3 was transported in six loads consisting of the firing platform, carriage, cradle, barrel, breech and an electric generator.

The Wehrmacht was not content with the gun's performance: "It was felt to be wasteful of time and manpower, the transport arrangements were cumbersome and the performance was not considered to be commensurate with the size of weapon." These led to experiments by Krupp and Rheinmetall to extend the range. These included "pre-grooved" projectiles which showed no significant improvement, squeeze-bore, discarding sabot and even a smoothbore version. None of these reached beyond the experimental stage.

Notes

References
 Engelmann, Joachim and Scheibert, Horst. Deutsche Artillerie 1934–1945: Eine Dokumentation in Text, Skizzen und Bildern: Ausrüstung, Gliederung, Ausbildung, Führung, Einsatz. Limburg/Lahn, Germany: C. A. Starke, 1974
 Gander, Terry and Chamberlain, Peter. Weapons of the Third Reich: An Encyclopedic Survey of All Small Arms, Artillery and Special Weapons of the German Land Forces 1939-1945. New York: Doubleday, 1979 
 Hogg, Ian V. German Artillery of World War Two. 2nd corrected edition. Mechanicsville, PA: Stackpole Books, 1997 
 Weapon Production Totals on Sinews of War

World War II artillery of Germany
Siege artillery
240 mm artillery
Krupp
Rheinmetall
Military equipment introduced in the 1930s